Elizabeth Tudor (2 July 1492 – 14 September 1495) was the second daughter and fourth child of Henry VII of England and Elizabeth of York.

Life
Elizabeth was born on 2 July 1492 at Sheen Palace in Surrey (later rebuilt by her father as Richmond Palace, the remains of which are now part of Richmond-Upon-Thames, London). Her wet nurse, Cecily Burbage, was a married gentlewoman from Hayes.

Death
Elizabeth died at Eltham Palace in Kent on 14 September 1495 at the age of three years and two months. Her tomb in Westminster Abbey is made from Purbeck and black marble. On top of the monument is a finely polished slab of black Lydian, upon which were placed inscriptions to Elizabeth and her effigy of copper gilt, both of which have now disappeared with time. The Latin from the inscription can be translated:

The plate at the feet of her effigy is translated:

The following year in 1496, Henry and Elizabeth had another daughter, Mary, who became the Queen of France. Their final two children, Edmund (who died in 1500 at the age of 15 months) and Katherine (who died in 1503 shortly after birth), were laid to rest by young Elizabeth's side.

Ancestry

References

External links
 Henry VIII's Lost Sister Elizabeth Tudor

1492 births
1495 deaths
15th-century English people
15th-century English women
People from Greenwich
House of Tudor
English princesses
Children of Henry VII of England
Burials at Westminster Abbey
Royalty and nobility who died as children
Daughters of kings